Bikkulovo (Biqqol) is a rural locality (a village) in Akbarisovsky Selsoviet, Sharansky District, Bashkortostan, Russia. The population was 47 as of 2010. There is 1 street.

Geography 
Bikkulovo is located 10 km northeast of Sharan (the district's administrative centre) by road. Ursayevo is the nearest rural locality.

References 

Rural localities in Sharansky District